Frederick Seymour (6 September 1820 – 10 June 1869) was a colonial administrator. After receiving little education and no inheritance from his father, Seymour was offered a junior appointment in the colonial service by Prince Albert. Seymour held positions in various British colonies from 1842 to 1863, when he returned to England

From 1864 to 1866, he served as the second Governor of the Colony of British Columbia, succeeding Sir James Douglas. He would enter government at a time of unrest, with the Fraser River gold rush causing violence within the colony and had to deal with large debts left over from Douglas's time as governor.

During his time as Governor, Seymour was involved in the aftermath of the Chilcotin Uprising and made better relations with local indigenous groups of British Columbia. He believed the colony would endure as its own entity and constantly invested in different initiatives he hoped would further the economic growth of the colony, from the construction of roads to bringing infrastructure to British Columbia. Though opposed to it, Seymour played a major role in the development of the constitution that would be used to unite British Columbia and Vancouver Island. Seymour continued to serve as the first governor of the union of the two colonies, also named the Colony of British Columbia from 1866 to 1869. Also Seymour was a key player in developing, creating and cementing a relationship with the indigenous nations such as the sto:lo.

Early life and career
Frederick Seymour was born on 6 September 1820 to Henry Augustus Seymour and Margaret Williams, in Belfast, Northern Ireland. He was the fourth, and younger son to Henry and Margaret. Henry Augustus Seymour was the illegitimate son of Francis Seymour-Conway, 2nd Marquess of Hertford, received his education at Harrow, Pembroke College, Cambridge, and the Inns of Court. He was given family property in Ireland, a secured private income, as well as a position in the customs service. However, this all ended with the succession of the 3rd Marquis of Hertford in 1822, and Henry Seymour was forced to take his family to Brussels, Belgium to reside.

Frederick's eldest brother, Francis (later General Sir Francis Seymour, 1st Baronet), was very successful and distinguished. He had a successful military career and had established a friendship with Prince Albert in 1838, and resided at Kensington Place until his death in 1890.

Frederick Seymour was just two years old when his father lost his fortune, and as result, he did not receive a good education or inheritance, unlike his older siblings. In 1842, Prince Albert intervened on his behalf, and Frederick Seymour obtained a junior appointment in the Colonial Service. He was given the title of Assistant Colonial Secretary of Van Diemen's Land (present day Tasmania), which marked the beginning of Seymour's life spent in colonies. The colonies Seymour worked in were "all in a traditional stage of development and which were all torn by political strife and encumbered with serious economic problems." Seymour worked as the Assistant Colonial Secretary of Van Diemen's Land until his position was dissolved.

In 1848, he was appointed Special Magistrate at Antigua in the Leeward Islands. He faced challenges with labour due to the abolition of slavery, and with sugar planting over disputes over trade policies. He became President of Nevis in 1853, where he supported free trade despite opposition from the leading families in that area. As a reward for his good service and hard work, he was promoted to Superintendent of British Honduras (present day Belize) in 1857, and Lieutenant-Governor of the Bay Islands, and later to Lieutenant-Governor of Honduras.

In 1863, Seymour spent some time in England, and on his return to Belize he received a letter from the Duke of Newcastle, then Colonial Secretary. In the letter, the Duke offered Seymour the promotion to the governorship of British Columbia; he had already informed Sir James Douglas that he had recommended Seymour to Queen Victoria as "a man of much ability and energy who has shown considerable aptitude for the management of savage tribes." Seymour accepted this offer, and the transition to a more moderate climate pleased him. "It is highly gratifying to me, to accept this important trust from the Secretary of State to whom I owe my introduction to the Colonial Service. The prospect of a change from the swamps of Honduras to a fine country is inexpressibly attractive to me, and I trust, in the bracing of air of North America to prove myself worthy of your Grace's confidence and kindness."

Seymour returned to England for a short visit, and when he left for North America, he was accompanied by Arthur Nonus Birch, a junior clerk in the Colonial Office, who was to remain in British Columbia for approximately two to three years, taking up the position of Seymour's Colonial Secretary.

Governor of the Colony of British Columbia (1864–66)
Newcastle had hoped to create a Maritime region in the west, expanding on the success of the gold trade and the previous presence of the British Royal Navy during the gold rushes. This would require the union of the Vancouver Island Colony and British Columbia, but the extreme rivalry between the two colonies would continue to prevent this. With the retirement of Sir James Douglas who previously served as Governor of both colonies, Capitan Arthur Edward Kennedy was appointed Governor of Vancouver Island on 11 December 1863. Seymour was soon after appointed Governor of mainland British Columbia on January 11, 1864. With the increase in the local economy because of the gold rush, the Imperial Office hoped that British Columbia could become a self-sustaining colony with Seymour spearheading the local legislation. With Seymour's commitment to become Governor, Newcastle promised him a personal residence to be paid for by the colony as well as a yearly salary of £3,000.

When Seymour arrived the settlers of the area greeted him with enthusiasm, and his passion towards bettering the colony quickly grew. He was introduced to the Royal Engineers plan to clear the hillside of the North bank of the Fraser River in order to prepare for the gold rush that would occur in the spring of the following year. The Fraser River had struck gold in 1857-58, and with the wave of miners from California and other parts of the west came a reign of bloodshed and lawlessness across the land. Douglas had struggled to control this, and with the request of reinforcement in 1858, the Royal Navy was sent in order to help control the conflict. With the control of the violence within white settler and miner communities, followed the increase in violence instigated by local indigenous groups, the Chilcotin.

Seymour was astounded by the wilderness of British Columbia, and in his reports to Lord Cardwell often spoke of the grandiose job ahead of them to create mining infrastructure. He soon took up permanent residence in New Westminster, which first began as a survey camp of the Royal Engineers that became the colony's new capital. Seymour quickly developed warm relationships with the colonists and made friends with the local officials. During his time in New Westminster he developed the resident prejudice against Victoria, and with that a stance against the union of the two colonies. Seymour believed that the policies that Douglas drafted as governor were to let the businessmen of Vancouver Island control the Cariboo gold trade and that the mainland colony had long been neglected and its resources expedited elsewhere. He said that the mainland colony "was only a colony in name. There was a goldmine at one end of a line of road and a seaport town under a different government at the opposite terminus."

Douglas had put the colony deep into debt, leaving Seymour with an outstanding loan of  £100,000. This combined with the Cariboo Road debt that would accumulate led to Seymour constantly fighting with the Imperial office for more money and the forgiveness of past loans. The debt would only continue to grow as Seymour mobilized troops in order to put down various indigenous uprisings.  Seymour was shocked when he discovered that the Imperial Government anticipated leaving British Columbia, which would leave the colony defenseless at a time where uprisings were not uncommon. Colonies at this time were considered liabilities by the Imperial office. They were expensive, difficult to defend as well as govern. Earlier disturbances in the British Columbia territory forced Sir James Douglas to expand control to stabilize the frontier, but this had put doubt into the Imperial overseers who doubted the prosperity of the colony.

Moving forward with the development of the mainland economy, Seymour heavily invested in the building of wagon roads to the gold mining district of Cariboo. There was to be a 120-mile road built from Cariboo to the Bute Inlet, and the end of 1864 saw the completion of surveying for the project. This development led to the increase in frequency of indigenous uprisings and attacks on road workers. The most notable of which was Chilcotin Uprising, an attack by Tsilhqot'in warriors on a road party that ended in the deaths of 14 workmen and later the murder of a local ferryman. Clashes had become more frequent since the 1858 Fraser River gold rush, with tensions constantly growing between local Chilcotin groups and white settlers. The Chilcotin communities' minimal interaction with fur traders and white settlers led to distaste from the beginning and escalated, as more arrived each spring to participate in the gold rush.

Seymour had been in office only a few weeks when he was informed of the murders and was quick to react to the events, immediately dispatching a force from New Westminster led by Chartres Brew, Chief Inspector of Police, of twenty-eight men. When Brew soon returned requesting reinforcements, Seymour helped Brew raise a militia as well as chose to accompany him on his expedition. Seymour hoped to form better relations with local indigenous groups, and pushed for the expedition to reach the heart of Chilcotin Country. Seymour and Brew's party pursued the Tsilhqot'in warriors deep into Chilcotin territory. Seymour eventually met with the Chilcotin leader Alexis at Puntzi Lake, where he was informed that the Chilcotin chiefs had lost control of the groups performing the raids. Many had renounced their loyalty to the chiefs and worked as separate units and had "a right to make war on [them] without it being any affair of [theirs]". Eventually, with the help of Chilcotin Chiefs, the murders were rounded up and handed over to William Cox, the Gold Commissioner of Cariboo. Seymour had the power to implement clemency but decided against it to prevent future uprisings.

After settling matters with the Chilcotin uprisings, Seymour began to travel around the colony inspecting different aspects and meeting with local officials. When visiting the Cariboo mines, he was overwhelmed by the loyalty and support he received from the miners. His three-month tour of the colony ended in discussions with various Chilcotin chiefs in order to work towards peace between the first nations and white settlers in the area.

When he finally returned to New Westminster, he was faced with many problems awaiting his attention. The Collins Overland Telegraph Company looked to installing a telegraph line that would connect America and Russia, running through British Columbia Territory. New gold had been discovered on the Kootenay River east of New Westminster, which led to the implementation of a higher gold export tax that Seymour implemented in 1865. This all meant more movement by settlers, workers and miners into British Columbia.

Most notably, the question of union was becoming more prominent a concern than ever. The Vancouver Island Colony private assembly became too heavy a cost to the Imperial government, and it looked to unite the colonies under a single administration. Seymour had put much of his own faith into the future prosperity of the British Columbia colony, but with the failure of the private banking venture at the Cariboo mines in 1864 and the failure of the usual rush of miners to the area in 1865, Seymour realized union was likely, inevitable. Even with bleak prospects, Seymour continued to invest in road expansion in order to connect more industrial communities on the mainland and grow the colonies economy. By 1865, business in Victoria was faltering because of the failure of the usual miners rush. Governor Kennedy's assembly began to push for the consolidation of the two colonies, and the Colonial Office looked to Seymour for advice on the possibility of a future union.

Seymour was called back to England in September 1865 to inform the Colonial Office about the conditions of the pacific coastline. When making his recommendations, Seymour mentioned "the extreme inconvenience to myself of the position of two Governors of equal authority close to each other yet far from home." Despite this, he still strongly opposed the union with the opinion that it would do nothing for the mainland colony of British Columbia. However, during his time in England, Seymour found that not only the Hudson's Bay Company and the Bank of British Columbia wanted confederation but also the military and naval men supported amalgamation of the colonies. Seymour was forced to accept the inevitable, and began working with the Colonial Office to construct the policies around the union.

His involvement in the discussion of the union was briefly interrupted by his wedding to Florence Maria Stapleton (1832–1902), daughter of Hon. Reverend Sir Francis Stapleton on January 27, 1866. Even while on his honeymoon, Seymour was still communicating with his attorney general on how the unionization of the colonies should go about. He insisted that the constitution of the united colonies would be "that of British Columbia", and the capital would be located at New Westminster. He insisted that he, the Governor of British Columbia, would announce the act of union between the two colonies. With the constitution being that of British Columbia, the preservation of British Columbia tariff acts would hold. Most of Seymour's suggestions were used, and the act of union came to fruition after being hurried through parliament in November 1866. Soon, with the announcement by Seymour in both New Westminster and Victoria, the Crown Colony of British Columbia was established.

Involvement in Indigenous Political Relations (1864–1869)
In 1864, Fredrick Seymour succeeded Sir James Douglas as governor, whom had worked to develop a reputable relationship with British Columbia's Indigenous nations. Coming into office, Seymour had communicated his desire to have the same rapport as Douglas had, stating that "my heart is as good to the Indian as to the white man". Local Sto-lo and Salish groups were concerned with the switch of office due to Douglas's retirement, because they feared that the formal governmental agreements they had made with the former governor would be abolished, and due to Seymour's inexperience in working with Indigenous nations. A large number of Sto:lo approached Douglas in New West Minister a few weeks prior to his retirement to express their concerns about the fragility of their agreements.

The former agreements were on land protection acts, providing the Sto:lo with the "choicest prairie lands" and offering "nearly a mile frontage for each Indian". Douglas was criticized for his kindness and care towards the First Nations by settlers and the Legislative Council, stating that the allotted land for reserves were "unnecessarily large" and "interfering with the development of the agricultural resources of the colony. Seymour was faced with the battle of land and the relationship between government, settlers, and Indigenous nations throughout his career.

On 24 May 1864, Seymour invited surrounding Indigenous nations to celebrate the Queen's Birthday, and further, begin to establish their relationship. Over 3500 Indigenous peoples gathered in New Minister, travelling over a 200km radius down the Fraser River, to participate in the week-long celebration.  During this time, the Salish and Sto:lo inducted Seymour through speeches made by Chiefs, welcoming him into his new position. Furthermore, they offered their first petition to Seymour: the petition of 1864. This governmental paper was signed by 55 Coast Salish Leaders. It included the following passage,

Seymour accepted this petition, and once the Salish and Sto:lo nations left back to their lands, Seymour admitted that he felt "he had established with them some of the same rapport that Douglas, their "Great Chief", had previously enjoyed (Ormsby 8). However, in many oral histories, Seymour is regarded as "someone who broke promises" and "has been dubbed as a bad person". The sentiments were brought on by Seymour's follow of the governmental policy that "Native peoples could neither own nor occupy land that the crown had made available to settlers".

That was followed by another petition in 1868, which was signed by 70 Salish and Sto:lo leaders and written by young children who had been educated by missionaries. Essentially, the petition pleaded that the governor "prevent white men from selling liquour to their people, asked that all Indigenous peoples be exempt from tolls for transporting goods on the Fraser River, and to protect Indigenous lands and fishing rights". The petition went on to directly say,

Through his time as governor, Seymour also supported the presence of Missionaries on Sto:lo and Salish reserves to educate and help "integrate them into society". The missionaries themselves offered protection from the disturbance of reserve size, from "bad white men and from bad Indians" and in addition, help with the petitions, in exchange for the "cultivation of land as farmers, sending the children to school and listening to what the clergymen tell you and believe in it". Many Sto:lo and Salish nations accepted these conditions, which can be seen through the presence of Father Fouquet in the 1866 Petition.

Throughout his business as Governor, Seymour involved himself extensively in problems which were raised. For example, in May 1869, reports and concerns were established about the continuous warring between tribes in Northern BC. Seymour set out in boat with other hired men to extinguish the battling, successfully settling the rivalries and paying each tribe a compensation once they had signed a peace treaty. The Governor was commented on being "creditable to his administrative ability…and entirely in consonance with the kindliness of heart".

Also, Seymour's involvement in the Chilcotin Wars involved an expedition with 28 men, from the coast and inwards to the inland to find the guilty party of the killing of road workers. Along with persuading a Chilcotin Chief, Alexis in assisting with the venture, his "great object in joining the expedition to obtain moderation from the white men in the treatment of the Indians". However, Seymour later wrote in his journals that "Europeans should thus run down wild Indians and drive them to suicide of surrender…appears to me, I confess, a little short of marvellous".

Financial struggles and death
Leading up to Seymour's unification of Vancouver Island and British Columbia in 1866, there were financial difficulties in the colony of British Columbia. The interior gold fields had become empty leaving a mass number of miners to leave the colony altogether, to trail the abandonment of the mines the Collins Telegraph Line had been deserted leaving five-hundred men to face unemployment. Seymour attempted to delay the joining of Victoria and British Columbia due to having to reduce the administration to $88,000. Revenues in the United Colonies were non-existent; gold export tax was extremely low, as well as some unexpected shortcomings in customs receipts due to Victoria merchants. $100,000 in tobacco and alcohol was imported before the mainland tariffs were extended to the island forcing the colonies to lose even more money.

In 1867, with a population of 15,000 in the island and mainland together, the United Colonies had developed a debit of $1,300,000. Seymour was faced with a massive deficit in 1867 leaving the new province in a dire situation. Upon returning to the colonies after a fourteen-month absence, Seymour again left for a northern voyage to investigate a number of Indian disturbances. Later travelling to Grouse Lake in Caribou and William Duncan's Indian Community at Metlakatla, and by December, one of the only contacts his Colonial Office received from him was the request of a loan of $50,000 describing the critical financial position of his government. After that request, Birch, who was left with the acting duty of Governor of British Columbia while Seymour was gone for 14-months, was asked by Buckingham to prepare an account of how the colony was fairing under Seymour's government to the Cabinet.

With the exception of the gold returns from Cariboo, the rest of British Columbia had in a sense dropped off, and the overall situation of the province had not improved property values had decreased, people were dying, trade was declining, and there was very little revenue. The governor was also being extremely inattentive of his duties. The only possibility of acquiring relief from the financial situation was to propose entry to the Canadian federation. However, Seymour would not live to see British Columbia unified with Canada.

On 10 June 1869, Seymour died from typhoid asthenia on board HMS Sparrowhawk near the north coast of British Columbia. Seymour's body was transported to Victoria, British Columbia's chosen capital. After Seymour's death the colonial office was quick to find a replacement for him News of his death reached the Government House by the early hours of the morning on June 14, before noon that same day the Colonial Secretary, Lieutenant Philip James Hankin, R.N. had become the temporary administrator of the United Colonies. The Executive Council met and swore in Hankin with the customary oath of allegiance and oath of office, after the meeting a telegram was sent to the Secretary of State, informing them of the death.

The wire was received at Charing Cross Station on June 15, and at four o'clock in the afternoon on the same day the Colonial Office responded to Hankin replying that Anthony Musgrave was to be appointed the new Governor of British Columbia, which was to be released to the public immediately. Less than twenty-four hours after the news of Seymour's death had reached the capital, he had almost been forgotten, and a new Governor appointed, on the way from Newfoundland. Musgrave requested to visit England first in order to consult on information of public affairs, but the colonial office did not see that in his best interest and stated that he should come to British Columbia at once. Musgrave unlike Seymour was a pro-confederation governor, who advocated bringing Newfoundland into confederation with Canada and was looking for a quick transition into another governorship.

His widow, Florence Maria Seymour, lived in London, where she died in November 1902.

Places named for Seymour
Mount Seymour is a peak, a provincial park, and ski hill located in the Coast Mountains northeast of Vancouver, British Columbia.  There are two other, much lower, Mount Seymours; one on Quadra Island, offshore from the town of Campbell River, the other on Moresby Island in the Queen Charlotte Islands.
There are two watercourses named the Seymour River.  One flows from Mt. Seymour to Burrard Inlet, and the other into Shuswap Lake.
Seymour Arm is an arm of Shuswap Lake, British Columbia.
Seymour Inlet is located in a maze of inlets on the north flank of Queen Charlotte Strait.
Frederick Sound is located on the northern British Columbia Coast opposite Haida Gwaii.
There are two bands of mountains named the Seymour Range in British Columbia.  One is located on Southern Vancouver Island, and the other north of Shuswap Lake in the upper reaches of the Seymour River, at the head of which there is a Seymour Pass.
Seymour Street is a major north-south artery in downtown Vancouver, bounded to the south by the Granville Street Bridge, and to the north by Cordova Street.
Seymour Landing on Seymour Bay, on the southeast coast of Bowen Island, just west of West Vancouver.
Seymour Island, an islet in Sunderland Channel on the north coast of Hardwicke Island, in the Johnstone Strait area between Vancouver Island and the mainland to the north of it.

References

Civil servants from Belfast
Colonial Administrative Service officers
Colonial governors of British Columbia and Vancouver Island
1820 births
1869 deaths
Governors of British Honduras
Governors of Nevis
Colony of British Columbia (1866–1871) people
Colony of British Columbia (1858–1866) people